The 2008–09 Danish Superliga was the 19th season of Danish Superliga league championship, which determines the winners of the Danish football championship, governed by the Danish Football Association. The season started on 19 July 2008 and ended on 31 May 2009. The defending champions were Aalborg BK.

The Danish champions qualified for the 2009–10 UEFA Champions League qualifying round. Runners-up and 3rd placed team qualified for 2009–10 UEFA Europa League qualifying rounds. 11th and 12th placed teams were relegated to the 1st Division. The 1st Division champions and runners-up were promoted to the Superliga.

Promotion and relegation
The following teams were promoted to Superliga after the end of the 2007–08 season:
 Vejle BK (winners)
 SønderjyskE (runners-up)

The following teams were relegated from Superliga after the end of the 2007–08 season:
 Viborg FF (11th placed)
 Lyngby BK (12th placed)

Participating clubs

Stadia and locations

Managerial changes

League table

Results

Matchday 1–11

Matchday 12–33

Goals
Source: dbu.dk

Top goalscorers

Own goals
Frank Hansen (Esbjerg) for Vejle (27 July 2008)
Sladan Peric (Vejle) for AaB (2 August 2008)
Morten Rasmussen (Horsens) for Midtjylland (3 August 2008)
Michael Beauchamp (AaB) for Copenhagen (21 September 2008)
Alexander Östlund (Esbjerg) for OB (19 October 2008)
Michael Stryger (SønderjyskE) for Randers (2 November 2008)
Michael Jakobsen (AaB) for Esbjerg (16 November 2008)
Jacob Stolberg (SønderjyskE) for Brøndby (22 November 2008)
Søren Berg (Randers) for Brøndby (21 March 2009)
Kristijan Ipša (Midtjylland) for AGF (13 April 2009)
Adam Eckersley (Horsens) for Copenhagen (25 April 2009)
Sölvi Ottesen (SønderjyskE) for Midtjylland (27 April 2009)

Hat-tricks

Season statistics

Scoring
 First goal of the season: Bedi Buval for Randers against AGF (19 July 2008)
 Fastest goal in a match: Frank Kristensen (17 seconds) for Midtjylland against Brøndby (31 May 2009)
 Widest Winning Margin: SønderjyskE 0–6 Brøndby (22 November 2008)
 Most Goals in a Match: Brøndby 4–3 Horsens (3 November 2008) / Copenhagen 5–2 Horsens (7 December 2008) / Nordsjælland 6–1 Randers (10 April 2009) / OB 6–1 AGF (4 May 2009)
 First hat-trick of the season: Babajide Collins Babatunde for Midtjylland against OB (10 August 2008)

Cards
 First yellow card: Lee Nguyen for Randers against AGF (19 July 2008)
 First red card: Martin Pedersen for AaB against Midtjylland (20 July 2008)
 Fastest red card in a match: Michael Beauchamp (17 minutes) for AaB against OB (17 August 2008)

Attendances
Source: hvemvandt.dk

Player of the Month

Kits

See also
 2008–09 Danish Cup
 2008–09 Danish 1st Division
 2008–09 in Danish football

References

External links
 Official website 
 ligafodbold.dk 
 haslund.info 

Danish Superliga seasons
1
Denmark